Lud or LUD may refer to:
 Local usage details, a record of local calls made from and received by a particular phone number
 Ludic language, a Finnic language spoken in Karelia

People 
 Lud son of Heli, a legendary British king who in Geoffrey of Monmouth's pseudohistorical Historia Regum Britanniae founded London and was buried at Ludgate
 Lud, son of Shem, a grandson of Noah
 Lludd Llaw Eraint, a mythical Welsh figure cognate with king Nuada Airgetlám
 Lud Fiser (1908–1990), American football and baseball player and coach
 Lud Gluskin (1898–1989), Russian jazz bandleader
 Lud Kramer (1932–2004), American politician
 Ned Ludd, founder of the Luddite movement in 18th- and 19th-century Britain

Places 
 Lud River, a river of New Zealand's South Island
 Ludlow railway station, England
 River Lud, a river of England, canalised as the Louth Navigation
 Stone Lud, a standing stone in Caithness, in the Highland area of Scotland
 Lud Gate, a city gate in the London area of Ludgate
 Lüderitz Airport, Namibia, IATA code

Fiction 
 Lud (city), a city in Stephen King's Dark Tower series
 Lobby Lud, a character used in British newspaper scavenger hunts in the 1920s
 Lud-in-the-Mist, novel by British writer (Helen) Hope Mirrlees

See also
 Ludd (disambiguation)
 Lod, a city in Israel (formerly Lydda)